General Steuart may refer to:

George H. Steuart (brigadier general) (1828–1903), Confederate States Army brigadier general
George H. Steuart (militia general) (1790–1867), Confederate States Army major general
Sir James Steuart Denham, 8th Baronet (1744–1839), British Army general
William Steuart (British Army officer) (1643–1726), British Army general

See also
General Stuart (disambiguation)
General Stewart (disambiguation)